Pope Pius XII apostolic writings includes his apostolic writings from March 2, 1939, to October 9, 1958. This list is complete only for the years 1939-1945. It includes only incomplete listings for the years 1946-1958.

A
Abbiamo Appreso  November 16, 1942
Acerrimo Moerore
Ad Perpetuam August 28, 1958
A Lei July 20, 1943
Au Moment October 24, 1944

B
Ben Volontieri October 19, 1945

C
 Chiamati December 8, 1942
Cum Jam Lustri
Cupimus Imprimis
Cum Septimum June 10, 1945
Cum Quintum March 25, 1943

D
Dans la tristesse July 31, 1940
Decimo Ex Eunte November 18, 1942
Decennium Dum Expletur
Denis Transactis Lustris May 5, 1942
Dum Maerenti Animo
Dum Saeculum Armorum April 15, 1942
Dum difracta August 5, 1943
Dum Post May 12, 1945

E
Existimare vos 29 June 1942
Ex amantissimis October 30, 1945
Ex Communiter January 15, 1945

G
 Gli Auguri Natalizi December 2, 1942
Gloriosam Reginam
Giungono Da Ogni Parte December 21, 1940

I
Intimo Gaudio June 29, 1941
Inter Plura February 10, 1944
Impensiore Caritate
 In cotidianis precibus March 24, 1945

L
La Lettera January 25, 1943
Letitiam Cepimus August 15, 1945
 L'expression June 29, 1940
Le notizie November 30, 1942
M
 Menti nostrae

N
Nosti Profecto July 6, 1940
Nel Triste Indugare October 25, 1944
Nous Avons July 14, 1945
Novimus Nos

 P
Per hos Postremos Annos June 29, 1945
Provide Hoc August 28, 1945
Primo Exeunte Saeculo March 20, 1944
Poloniae Annalibus

Q
Quamavis Immanis November 25, 1943
Quamvis plane April 20, 1941
 Quandoquidem April 20, 1939
 Quandoquidem March 7, 1942
Quartum Exactum November 21, 1945
Quocumque Oculos April 20, 1944

S
Sacro Vergente
Singolari Animi  May 12, 1939
Singolaris Annis  April 15, 1943

T
Tria Saecula September 1, 1945

V
Veritatem Facientes
Vixdum Nobis November 1, 1945